Tarnetar is a village in the Surendranagar district of the state of Gujarat in India. It is situated near the city of Thangadh.

Trinetreshwar Temple 

Tarnetar is widely known for Trinetreshwar Temple, and the fair held here. It is believed that the temple belongs to the Solanki Era. The Pratihara kings, predominantly the worshipers of Lord Shiva were great builders and architecturally brilliant. They were ardent patrons of art and sculpture. The Trinetreshwar temple is an ornate and evolved example of its time portraying the Gurjjar Pratihar style. Owing to the reign of the Pratihar kings, the regions were later called as the Panchal region. The temple was later reconstructed without changing its architectural beauty by the King of Lakthar, Karansinghji in memory of his son.

The Tarnetar temple is surrounded by three Kunds : the Vishnu Kund, the Bhrahma Kund and the Shiv Kund - south of which a cellar is built. It is popularly believed that a dip in its waters is as holy as a dip in the sacred River Ganges.

Tarnetar fair 
Tarnetar is known for its annual fair, the Trinetreshwar Mahadev Mela, which is held near the Trinetreshwar Mahadev temple. It attracts villagers from all over the region as well as tourists. Around  100,000 people typically attend.

References

External links 

 Tarnetar official website

Villages in Surendranagar district